Siddharth Venugopal is a former Indian actor and Assistant director who has appeared in Tamil films. He made his debut in Gandhi Krishna's romantic musical Ananda Thandavam (2009), also playing a supporting role alongside Vijay Antony in Naan (2012).Currently he is working in Intuit Inc as the Director of Continuous Improvement & International Sourcing.

Early life
Siddharth Venugopal was born on 28 November 1985 in Hyderabad, India to a Tamil family. He has a sister named Rathi. He was schooled in the city attending Lisieux Matriculation Higher Secondary School Coimbatore, before moving on to complete a degree in information technology at Kumaraguru College of Technology. Following a brief stint in films, he returned to education in 2011 after signing up for an MBA at Graziadio School of Business and Management at Pepperdine University, California.

Career
During his college days, Siddharth had taken up modelling assignments and acting courses and in October 2007, six months old in a Chennai multinational company, he got a call from director Gandhi Krishna’s office, after the director saw him in a print ad. After a six-hour audition, he was selected to play the lead role in the director's romantic musical Ananda Thandavam, a film adaptation of the Sujatha serialized novel Pirivom Santhippom. The film was shot in India and USA for more than a year and featured him alongside Tamannaah and Rukmini Vijayakumar. However the film opened to unanimously poor reviews in early 2009, with a critic from Sify.com stating that the actor "can do little to save the film". Rediff.com felt that Siddharth's performance was one of the weaker aspects of the film noting "though he does his best when he's romancing his beloved, and there are sparks during emotional scenes, he seems to miss his cue a few times, making you wonder if someone with acting chops might not have done a better job."

Siddharth, before the release of his debut film had agreed to star in another film produced by Aascar Ravichandran to be directed by newcomer Jeeva Shankar. The film titled Naan was to see him portraying the lead role with Rukmini Vijayakumar playing the lead female role, however due to the failure of his previous film, the producer called off the project. The film restarted with Vijay Antony's interception as producer in 2010, while the music director making his debut as an actor also took the lead role from Siddharth. The film was shot over two years, with Siddharth playing a supporting role, amongst an ensemble cast also including actresses Rupa Manjari, Anuya Bhagwat and Vibha Natarajan. The film released in August 2012 to predominantly positive reviews, with Siddharth gaining critical acclaim for his performance of the rich youngster, Ashok with a critic noting he is "impressive".

Filmography

References 

Indian male film actors
Male actors in Tamil cinema
Living people
Male actors from Tamil Nadu
21st-century Indian male actors
1985 births
People from Coimbatore